Ana María Rodríguez (born 2 October 1962) is a Spanish former alpine skier who competed in the 1980 Winter Olympics.

References

1962 births
Living people
Spanish female alpine skiers
Olympic alpine skiers of Spain
Alpine skiers at the 1980 Winter Olympics